EX.CO is a Disney-backed content experience platform powering billions of personalized interactions around the web. The company's self-serve, personalization technology is used by brands, publishers, and small and medium-sized businesses to easily modify their websites with interactive, digital content and video experiences that cater to the end user.EX.CO (as Playbuzz) had the most shared content on Facebook in January 2015, with an estimated 9 million shares in one month.

History
 
EX.CO was originally founded as Playbuzz in 2012 by Shaul Olmert and Tom Pachys. Pachys is a graduate of IDC and also the cofounder of Whimado.

Playbuzz originally raised $3 million in a Series A funding round from Carmel Ventures.
 
The company was listed by Inc. as one of the "15 Israeli Startups Getting Hot at the Turn of 2015", and also voted one of Europe's Hottest Startups the same year by Wired.
 
In September 2017, the company announced it had raised an additional $35 million in a Series C funding round led by Viola Group with participation from existing investors including the Walt Disney Company and Saban Ventures. This brought Playbuzz's total funding to $66 million.

In November 2019, Playbuzz changed its company name to EX.CO.

In 2021, EX.CO announced that its chief marketing officer Shachar Orren was appointed as its new cofounder. Later that year, EX.CO announced Efrat Zohar Reisman would join the company as its new chief people officer.

In 2022, EX.CO appointed Maya Szutan-Azoulay as the new chief operating officer.

Acquisitions

In 2021, EX.CO acquired video monetization technology company Cedato.

In 2022, the company announced the acquisition of the machine-learning company Bibblio. The deal allows EX.CO to further provide website personalization capabilities to brands, publishers, and e-commerce businesses.

Product

EX.CO provides tools for web personalization, video monetization, online advertising, content marketing, landing pages, web development, online subscriptions, web performance, and audience measurement.

EX.CO also works with e-commerce businesses. American jewelry retailer ALEX AND ANI doubled their revenue while using EX.CO's online product recommendations as gift matching guides.

See also
 
 Website monetization
 Online advertising
 Web performance
 Audience measurement
 Customer engagement

References

External links
 Ex.co official website

Companies established in 2012
Companies based in New York City
Companies based in Tel Aviv
Online advertising
Digital marketing companies of the United States
Marketing companies established in 2012
Israeli inventions